is the twelfth entry of Toei Company's Super Sentai metaseries. The last Super Sentai title of the Shōwa Era, it aired on TV Asahi from February 27, 1988 to February 18, 1989, replacing Hikari Sentai Maskman and was replaced by Kousoku Sentai Turboranger. Its international English title as listed by Toei is simply Liveman. 

It was the first Super Sentai series to have a female Blue Ranger as well as the first Super Sentai series that introduced animal-based mecha. It was also the first Super Sentai series that introduced a super-combined robot (that is 2 or more robots put together); the first Super Sentai series to have three members from the start, with two additional members joining later on; it was the last Super Sentai series that had its mechas transported to the battle through a flying fortress on a regular basis, which would not occur again until Bakuryū Sentai Abaranger; and it was the first Super Sentai series to have both a Green Ranger and a Black Ranger in the main five, as opposed to interchanging one with another, which would not occur again until Engine Sentai Go-onger.

Plot
Academia Island is an elite school that various genius students from across the globe attend. Among them are Yusuke Amamiya, Joh Ohara and Megumi Misaki who with Takuji Yano and Mari Aikawa sought to create a suit strong enough for space exploration. However, three of their classmates and friends Kenji Tsukigata, Rui Senda, and Goh Omura felt their talents were being wasted and leave to join an evil organization called Volt who offers to raise their full scientific potential. As a result, when Yusuke and company saw them leaving, Kenji draws a gun on the three with Takuji and Mari taking the fatal blow. Soon after, one of the professors at the school Professor Hoshi pitches in to help Yusuke and his friends complete the suits so they can serve to prepare against Volt.

And then in 1988, the present day, with Kenji, Rui, and Goh now known as Doctors Kemp, Mazenda and Obular, Volt begins its attack by devastating Academia Island. As a result, Yusuke, Joh, and Megumi take up the suits they created and become the Livemen to battle against their former classmates and Volt. Though they managed to get Goh to leave Volt, the organization recruits new members in Doctor Ashura and the aliens Guildos and Butchy. Soon after, the Livemen are joined by Tetsuya and Jun-ichi, the respective younger brothers of Takuji and Mari, while learning that there is a darker agenda behind Volt that only its leader Bias knows.

Characters

Academia

Livemen

/: A poor student at Academia, but a strong leader and quick at thinking under pressure. He is a brave hard worker and enjoys rock music and work outs. Initially starts as a hot-headed and sarcastic rebel, but grows into the role of dependable leader as the series progresses. Yusuke was once in love with Rui Senda, but she did not return his love. He was good friends with Kenji during their first year or so at Academia until things went sour between them once Kenji started down a dark path. In the 2001 Sentai direct-to-DVD crossover film Hyakujuu Sentai Gaoranger vs. Super Sentai, Yusuke is found visiting the graves of Takuji Yano, Rui Senda, Kenji Tsukigata, and Mari Aikawa. He briefly dueled Gaku Washio (Gao Yellow) in a sword fight and then lectured Gaku on the many sword-wielding warriors of the Super Sentai franchise, and introduced the Gaorangers to all the 23 other Red Warriors. He performed his roll call twice in that special, one along with the Dream Sentai and Gaorangers and then again with the other Red Warriors.
Weapons: , .
Attacks: .
/: He is at the bottom of the class at Academia and a sportsman and skateboarder. He is short-tempered and ready to dive into danger. Joh has the strength to back up his actions. He was once good friends with Goh and was heartbroken when their friendship dissolved once the weak-willed Goh fell into a bad crowd.  Years later, during Kaizoku Sentai Gokaiger Joh would appear to the Gokaigers and grant them the Greater Power of the team, which was their mecha Super Live Robo.  
 Weapons: , .
 Attacks: Skateboard Attack.
/: A top class student at Academia who was nonetheless friends with Yusuke and Joh and did powered suit research with them and the late Takuji Yano and Mari Aikawa. She is good at swimming and bicycling and was taught archery by her father. Megumi often criticizes Yuusuke's strategies. A caring figure, feeling even for her enemies. She is very skilled and has fired an arrow from the Dolphin Arrow while riding the Moto Dolphin.
Weapons: .
/ (28-49): The younger brother of Takuji and elder brother of Takeshi. He is good at boxing. He nearly destroyed the Gran Tortoise after being taken over by Volt. Tetsuya is generally a good-hearted person, but has a temper and hatred, mostly fueled by his desire for revenge on Kemp for the murder of his older brother.
Weapons: .
/: (29-49) The younger brother of Mari and a rugby player. He calls Tetsuya "Tetsu-chan", looking up to him as an older brother. The youngest member of the team, temporarily leaving high school in order to fight Volt. While impregnated by Vega Zuno, Junichi was fearful of the life inside him to the point of getting an abortion until the unborn Vega Baby pleas for its life and Junichi decides to "give birth," only to lose the child when it was killed by its biological parent and ended up getting a newfound respect for mothers.
Weapons: .

Arsenal
: The Liveman's transformation device. The right wrist is the one with the animal icon. When transforming by themselves, they transform by saying their name (i.e. "Red Falcon!", "Yellow Lion!" etc.). Starting with episode 4, they shout "Liveman!".
: The standard sidearm of the team. It can be used as a gun or be separated into a sword and shield. It can be brought out on its own from the Twin Brace without transforming.
: The finishing cannon used throughout the series. It was summoned by all three, and later five, members.
: First used in episode 22, it is a weapon formed from the Falcon Saber, Lion Bazooka, and Dolphin Arrow. It is apparently faster to bring out and fire than the Biomotion Buster.

Vehicles
: the individual motorcycles for the original trio, based on a Suzuki RH250.
: Red Falcon's Moto Machine.
: Yellow Lion's Moto Machine.
: Blue Dolphin's Moto Machine.
: A four-wheeled drive initially for the original trio. It is also used by Colon and later by Black Bison and Green Rhino. Based on a 2nd generation Suzuki Jimny.
: A flying fortress that carries the mecha components of the Live Robo and the Live Boxer.

Mecha
: The primary robot of the Liveman team formed when the command  is given. Apparently, as seen in some episodes, the Live Robo can be launched into battle already formed.
: Red Falcon's jet that forms the Live Robo's head, back, waist, thighs and the Live Shield. It is stored in the upper compartment of the Machine Buffalo. It has legs for touchdown. It appeared again in Gaoranger vs Super Sentai.
: Yellow Lion's mecha-lion. It forms the torso and arms of the Live Robo and the Double Cannons. It is stored in the lower compartment of the Machine Buffalo behind the Aqua Dolphin.
: Blue Dolphin's submarine. It forms the legs of the Live Robo. It is stored in the lower compartment of the Machine Buffalo in front of the Land Lion. It has wheels for land travel and can fire Dolphin Missiles.
: Liveman's second robot, formed when the command  is given.
: A trailer piloted by Black Bison that fires the Bison Beam from its horns; Red Falcon and Yellow Lion co-pilot at times. It forms the head, torso, arms, and left foot of the Live Boxer, and the left shoulder, helmet, waist shield, and feet of the Super Live Robo.
: A missile truck piloted by Green Rhino; Blue Dolphin co-pilots at times. It forms the legs and right foot of the Live Boxer, and the forearms and right shoulder of the Super Live Robo.
: The combination of the Live Robo and the Live Boxer into a powerful robot under the command .

Allies
: The principal of Academia who made the Gran Tortoise and gave the Liveman mecha the ability to combine before dying. He died helping a pregnant woman trapped in the rubble of Academia Island escape.
: A female robot built by Doctor Hoshi to be in charge of the Gran Tortoise and assist the team. She frequently supports Liveman on foot, car, bike, and the Machine Buffalo (especially before Black Bison and Green Rhino joined). Since Ashura appeared, Colon wanted to be more help to the Livemen and met Tanaka, a malfunctioning Dummyman who fell in love with her before he sacrificed himself to save her from the monster Dokugas Zuno. She later fell in love with Yusuke (who treated her coldly at that time until she saved him by taking a sword cut meant for him). She is able to swim, or otherwise move underwater, perhaps as part of being in charge of the Gran Tortoise. She has a habit of saying "Colon".
: An Academia student studying on the power suits for space travel with Yusuke, Joh, Megumi, and Mari. The older brother of Tetsuya and Takeshi. His prototype power suit featured a swallow. Yusuke was his best friend. He was killed protecting his friends from Kenji's blasts. He promised his youngest brother Takeshi to build a dream car with him, his death resulting in the death of Takeshi's dream until he approached Yusuke who agreed to help him build it, creating the Live Cougar. In the GaoRanger VS. Super Sentai Yusuke is found visiting his grave.
: An Academia student studying on the power suits for space travel with Yusuke, Joh, Megumi, and Takuji. The older sister of Jun-ichi. Her suit featured a dog. She was also working on the plans for the Bison Liner and the Sai Fire before her death. In the GaoRanger VS. Super Sentai Yusuke is found visiting her grave.
: Tetsuya and Junichi's benefactor, the leader of the Academia group that built the Bison Liner and the Sai Fire. She later arrives to help the Livemen by providing a new power core for the Bison Liner. She was played by French children entertainer Dorothée.

Relatives
: The younger brother of Takuji and Tetsuya, he met Yusuke and the others before Takuji was killed by Volt. He helps Yusuke complete the Live Cougar vehicle, which Yusuke started to build with Takuji. He is considerably younger than his two brothers and very little mention is made about his relation with Tetsuya.
: Go's mother. When Go was young, Toshiko pressured her son into succeeding academically at the expense of giving him a normal childhood. When Go returns to her home for refuge while hiding away from Volt, she becomes terrified when she witnesses her son's transformation into the monster Dr. Obler. Yusuke makes her see the error of her ways and she manages to revert Go back to his human form by reminding him of the motherly love she gave to him as a child.
: Megumi's father. He goes to Tokyo to visit his daughter with the intention of pairing her with a potential marriage partner. Although his archery skills has deteriorated as a result of his age, he is able to see through Volt's disguises when a group of Dummymen posed as hostages. He becomes proud of his daughter when he sees her use the Dolphin Arrow.
: A long-time friend of Yusuke who works as a day-care worker in a kindergarten, who also knew Kenji before he became Doctor Kemp. When she was a high school student, Kenji gave her a bouquet of roses he specially bred known as "Kenji Roses", which helped her mother recover from an illness due to the positive energy it radiated. Later, when Kenji suffered an accident from a lab experiment, she donated her blood to save his life, as she carries the same rare blood type (β ZO Negative). She still holds Kenji in high esteem, until she finds out that he has become Doctor Kemp.

Armed Brain Volt Army
Believing most of humanity to be inferior,  is based on the orbiting space station  with its officers using a triangular shuttle to journey between it and Earth. Though it appeared Volt's goal was to create the ideal world for superior geniuses and exterminate those with "inferior minds", its true agenda is to complete the Giga Brain Wave so Bias can achieve immortality while subjugating the human race via mind control.

: A super genius scientist whose appearance belies his actual age, well versed in all knowledge, and worshiped as a god by his officers. Bias' intellect prevents him from brutally punishing or berating his officers for their failures; he believes they should recognize and learn from their shame. In reality, Bias was originally human until he devised a means to cheat death by absorbing a mind-controlling thought pattern-based energy called "Giga Brain Wave". But as twelve minds with an IQ of 1,000 each are needed, Bias tricks eleven followers under him to be educated until achieving the ideal IQ. From there, Bias extracts the achievers' brains and places them in the Brain Room to set up the Giga Brain Wave. Hiding this from his current followers so he can complete the Giga Brain Wave, Bias took extremes by ordering the execution of Miku Kitamura, a girl from 2003, and then Gou, who unknowingly witnessed Bias' previous absorbing of an incomplete Giga Brain Wave. When the effects of it begin to waver, Bias attempts to use his incomplete Giga Brain Wave to have Tetsuya destroy the Grand Tortoise for him before it backfired and aged him before he managed to regain his youthful appearance. Soon after, once Kemp reaches the IQ of 1,000, Bias uses Kemp's brain to complete the Giga Brain Wave and becomes a child as a result of absorbing the energy. However, Kemp's spirit rallies the ghosts of Bias' previous victims to take their revenge, causing Bias to revert to his true aged self. He dies in a wizened state aboard the exploding Zuno Base with Gash, imagining the voices of people praising him.
: He is Yusuke's former friend at Academia whose dream was to develop biotechnological means to make humans immune to any disease. However, Kenji became egotistical and power-hungry after taking the test Bias sent to him, killing Takuji and Mari while leaving to join Volt. While in human form, he uses the Slit Cutter as a weapon. Wanting to power his Beauty Beast form, Kemp creates Gore Zuno to synthesize his β ZO Negative blood type before finding Mai, a young woman who saved his life after he suffered blood loss from a lab explosion. After deciding not to take her blood and the events of October 22, Bias is forced to discard his pride and undergo a risky operation to modify himself into a more powerful being. Though Megumi's interference caused him to regress to his teenage self with no memory of being in Earth Academia after, Kemp regains his memories upon remembering his low grade and completes his transformation into . In his new form, Kemp can use his Kemp Tentacles and execute attacks such as Kemp Demon Flare. He managed to obtain an IQ of 1,000, only to be betrayed by Biaswhicho takes his brain away. As a result, Kemp's body becomes the mindless  before being destroyed by the Super Live Robo. However, despite being bodiless, Kemp's mind can muster enough strength to rob Bias of his newfound youth, resulting in his death in the finale. In  Gaoranger VS. Super Sentai Yusuke is found visiting his grave.
: She is a haughty woman who was Megumi's rival at the Academia and broke Yusuke's heart. Rui reconstructs herself as a cyborg to reflect her coldness and her desire to preserve her beauty, with concealed weapons within her robotic body like the Arm Gun, Elbow Gun, and Finger Gun. However, Mazenda's subconsciousness expresses her regret for discarding her love and kindness which manifests in her attack pattern. Eventually, after the Miku incident, Mazenda begins to doubt Bias before she upgrades herself into . In her new state, 90% of Mazenda's body is fully mechanized with new built-in weapons like the Five-Finger Gun, Arm Bazooka, Elbow Gun Double Hit, and Crouch Knee Missile. However, upon learning the truth behind Bias' goals, Mazenda removed all organic traces of her being and became  to keep Bias from taking her brain. Mortally wounded as a result of defying Bias, Mazenda dies after regaining some of her former humanity. In GaoRanger VS. Super Sentai Yusuke is found visiting her grave. Her name is a pun on the word .
: He is Joh's one-time friend at Academia Island. Goh is a childhood prodigy who was forced by his mother to study with no time to play with other children. Struggling to meet everybody's expectations, Goh is brought into Volt by Bias out of pity and unknowingly witnessed Bias in his Brain Room. Using Volt's research with his inferiority complex as a motivation, Obler turns himself into a completely inhuman monster, called ; in this state, he uses a battle axe as his weapon. During the failed Benyo Zuno experiment, Obler suddenly regresses to Goh; although Guildos returns him to his monstrous form, he is expelled from Volt for his weakness as he reverted again. Stealing Guildos's cross-sword, Goh returns to Earth and takes refuge at his childhood home to perfect his Obler form, destroy the Livemen, and win back Bias' praise. But he is captured by the other Earth-based Volt scientists and used in the creation of the Obler Zuno. When the clone attempts to kill his mother, Obler takes the hit meant from her, reverting to an exhausted, nearly comatose Goh. Months after his rehabilitation, Goh regains his memories of when he was unknowingly used in Kemp's experiment with Tomei Zuno. Soon after, as the young man is a witness to his dark secret, Bias orders his forces to find Goh and kill him as Joh manages to get him to safety. Though guilt-ridden by his actions against him and the others, Goh reveals what he knew about Bias before he went into hiding. Goh later finds religion and tries to help the Livemen in hopes of saving Rui and Kenji. Though attempting to protect Mazenda from Gash, Goh is unable to save her in the end as he returns to his normal life again.
: He was a tough-as-nails underworld figure and gang leader with a poor education who bears a grudge against the Science Academia and those smarter than he is. When one of his men is converted into an Apeman by Hihi Zuno, Arashi tracks down the Zuno Beast and uses him to commit crimes before Yusuke battles Arashi in a fistfight before Obler's interference. Impressed with Arashi, Bias accelerates his intelligence to the point that he built a chamber that modifies him into his current form. Other than his newfound genius and brute strength, Ashura uses the attacks "Demon Kick", "Break Ashura", "Ashura Reverse Attack", and "Cut Ashura". Ashura also has a soft spot for women and has sided with Mazenda. He is targeted by Bias when he used Hacker Zuno to uncover suspicious articles regarding Bias' secret. Soon afterward, Bias decides that Ashura is a hopeless candidate and strips him of his super-intelligence. Back to being Arashi, he ends up being befriended by the Liveman and Goh before strapping himself with dynamite to make a suicide run on Battle Zuno.
: Bias's robot bodyguard, a relentless machine who has knowledge of firearms and uses his Video Eye to locate targets. Gash is also the only member of Volt who knows the actual plans of Bias. Though normally deployed to fire Giga Phantom enlargement bazooka and create Zuno Beasts, Gash is also sent to carry out missions like stealing the Metaforce Jewel from the robot Joh befriended. Gash eventually dies with Bias inside the Brain Base after losing his right forearm to Yusuke.
: A robot secretly built by Bias to spur his scientists to break their limitations, believing himself to be an alien intelligence from the planet Guildo. Eventually, becoming prideful from the false memories their creator installed into him, Guildos begins to question why he and Butchy should even follow Bias as he created the Zuno Beast Guild Zuno to prove himself superior to Bias. However, after overexerting his energy to repeatedly revive Guildo Zuno, Guildos malfunctions while realizing his true nature. In a state of shock that his entire life was a lie, Guildos trips and falls to his death.
: An orange ape-like robot secretly built by Bias to spur on Kemp et al. Like Guildos, he was made to have others believe he was an alien intelligence from the planet Chibuchi. Jocular likes roller skating and music (he claims to be a karaoke expert). His attacks include expanding the size of his hands to execute his Butchy Punch move. After learning the truth behind Guildos and himself, along with their purpose, Butchy is forced to continue serving Bias. However, while forcefully enacting his Rampaging Destruction scheme, Butchy's tears are noticed by Megumi. Despite Ashura's tough love, Butchy is stopped from further destruction by Megumi offering her friendship. His acceptance results in Butchy being labeled a dunce and targeted for execution. Though Megumi tries to save him, Bias activates the self-destruct within Butchy as he pushes Megumi away before exploding.
: The green-skinned android soldiers with mohawk 'haircuts'. They are very difficult to defeat, as their head and limbs operate independently when dismembered. Mazenda later develop a variant of Jimmers called  that can assume human form. In episode 13, a Dummyman who calls himself  defects from Volt and assists the Livemen after he falls in love with Colon before sacrificing himself to save her.

Others
: A dinosaur that Time Zuno brought to the present, Gon was befriended by a boy named Kenichii. While Mazenda and Kemp hold off the Livemen, Oblar later catches Gon and uses Gash to enlarge Gon into a giant berserker controlled by Oblar. Though overpowered, the Live Robo manages to restore Gon. However, Gon died as the result of the enlargement's side effects on non-Zuno Beasts.
: Created by Bias as the result of his Giga Project, using the Giga Metal that Kemp synthesized and powered by the Giga Energy developed by Mazenda from geothermic heat to build this giant robot personally. Once finally activated, this robot emerges with Kemp piloting it as it overpowers the Live Robo and counters its Super Live Crash before placing it in a Giga Field. But the interference of the Live Boxer results in the Live Robo being rescued and this robot is trapped in its own Giga Field. Doctor Ashura takes over this robot until it is finally destroyed by the newly formed Super Live Robo.

Episodes
Episodes aired on Saturdays at 6:00 PM JST.

Cast
Yusuke Amamiya: 
Joh Ohara: 
Megumi Misaki: 
Tetsuya Yano: 
Junichi Aikawa: 
Great Professor Bias: 
Kenji Tsukigata/Doctor Kemp:  (credited as )
Rui Senda/Doctor Mazenda:  (credited as )
Goh Omura/Doctor Obler: 
Arashi Busujima/Doctor Ashura:

Guest Stars
Doctor Hoshi:  (credited as ) (episodes 1 & 2)
Takuji Yano:  (episodes 1, 5, 8, 29 & 30)
Mari Aikawa:  (episodse 1, 8, 29 & 30)
Takeshi Yano:  (episode 5)
Great Professor Bias (Child):  (episodes 48 & 49)

Voice actors
Colon: 
Beast Man Obler: 
Guildos: 
Butchy: 
Gash: 
Narrator:

Songs
Opening theme

Lyrics: 
Composition: 
Arrangement: 
Artist: Daisuke Shima

Ending theme

Lyrics: Akira Ohtsu
Composition: Yasuo Kosugi
Arrangement: Ohzuchi Fujita
Artist: Daisuke Shima

International Broadcasts and Home Video
The series was broadcast on TF1 in France as Bioman 3, being marketed as the direct sequels to Choudenshi Bioman and Bioman 2 (Hikari Sentai Maskman). All episodes were dubbed in French. This was actually the fourth series to be shown in the region as they also aired Choushinsei Flashman in between Maskman and Liveman. (Dengeki Sentai Changeman was skipped.)
It was also broadcast in Spain as Bioman and it was the first Super Sentai series to broadcast in the country and one of two Sentai shows to be dubbed in Castilian Spanish. But however, only the first 25 episodes were dubbed and aired with the three members, while the other episodes featuring the additional two that would later join, did not air.
In 1991, Liveman was aired and dubbed in Latin America under the name La Súper Fuerza Liveman with unprecedented success. Along with Choushinsei Flashman, it is the only Sentai series to air in Latin America with dub.
On August 1991, The series aired with a Thai dub on Channel 7. The home video release was licensed by Video Square. But years later, a new Thai dub was made for newer home video release and distributed by Right Pictures.
Liveman was aired in the Philippines on ABS-CBN from 1991 to 1992.
South Korea released the series with a Korean dub in 1991 under Liveman: Warriors of Peace. (평화의 전사 라이브맨) As of the Korean dub of Kaizoku Sentai Gokaiger, it was officially renamed Power Rangers Liveman. (파워레인저 라이브맨)
The series also aired in Indonesia with an Indonesian dub and aired on RCTI in 1991 and re-aired in 1996.
This series along with the proceeding series Kousoku Sentai Turboranger were already both licensed to be aired in Brazil in the mid-1990's to be given a Brazilian Portuguese dub as merchandise were appearing locally. However, this fell through as Power Rangers was proven to be more popular to air and Saban was weighing competition in most international markets, when they adapted Toei's work. As a result, Liveman was not aired in the region.

References

External links
 Official Choujyu Sentai Liveman website 

Super Sentai
1988 Japanese television series debuts
1989 Japanese television series endings
TV Asahi original programming
1980s Japanese television series
Television series about animals